The 1999 Princeton Tigers football team was an American football team that represented Princeton University during the 1999 NCAA Division I-AA football season. Princeton tied for last in the Ivy League.

In their 13th and final year under head coach Steve Tosches, the Tigers compiled a 3–7 record and were outscored 225 to 184. Hamin Abdullah, David Ferrara and Chuck Hastings were the team captains.

Princeton's 1–6 conference record tied for seventh (and worst) in the Ivy League standings. The Tigers were outscored 184 to 135 by Ivy opponents. 

The Tigers played their home games at Princeton Stadium, on the university campus in Princeton, New Jersey.

Schedule

References

Princeton
Princeton Tigers football seasons
Princeton Tigers football